Antrohyphantes is a genus of  dwarf spiders that was first described by M. Dumitrescu in 1971.  it contains only three species: A. balcanicus, A. rhodopensis, and A. sophianus.

See also
 List of Linyphiidae species

References

Araneomorphae genera
Linyphiidae